Person County is a county located in the U.S. state of North Carolina. The population was 39,097 as of the 2020 census. The county seat is Roxboro.

Person County is included in the Durham-Chapel Hill Metropolitan Statistical Area, which is also included in the Raleigh-Durham-Chapel Hill Combined Statistical Area, which had an estimated population of 2,106,463 in the 2020 census.

History
The colonial government established Person County as part of Edgecombe County in 1746. County designations kept changing, and it was part of Granville County from 1746 to 1752; included in Orange County until 1778; and part of Caswell County until 1791/1792.  By dividing Caswell County into two squares–each side measuring approximately twenty (20) miles in length, the state formed two counties of  each. The county was named after Brigadier General Thomas Person, a Revolutionary War patriot, who made significant contributions to Person County and surrounding areas.

The area was first inhabited by Native Americans over 10,000 years ago. The historical tribes encountered here by early Spanish explorers were generally Siouan-speaking, including the Saponi, Occaneechee, and other groups.

Settlement by immigrants of Scots, Scots-Irish, English, French Huguenot, and German ancestry began in the mid-17th and continued into the 19th centuries. The settlers tended to be yeoman farmers, and few owned any slaves.

Religious affiliation in the county reflects the early settlers and is predominantly Protestant. Due to Person County's nearness to Virginia, the Carolina coast, and the Appalachian foothills, a wide variety of Southern American English dialects can be heard here, including Virginia Piedmont, Coastal Southern, South Midland, and African-American English.

Revolutionary and Civil Wars
The county was named for Brigadier General Thomas Person, a Revolutionary War patriot, who made significant contributions to Person County and surrounding areas. He was a trustee of the University of North Carolina at Chapel Hill. His generous donations were recognized by the construction and naming of Person Hall.

Lieutenant Colonel Stephen Moore, Deputy Quartermaster General of the Hillsborough district, was another Revolutionary War hero, commanding the Person County militia at the disastrous Battle of Camden. He was captured and held on the prison ship Torbay. In 1775-1776 he had purchased property in the south of Person County and named his plantation Mt. Tirzah. His home, constructed in 1778, has been renovated recently. Stephen Moore was buried in the family cemetery.

During the Civil War, Person County supplied between 800 and 1000 soldiers to the Confederate Army. A granite monument at the Courthouse honors E. Fletcher Satterfield, who carried the Confederate flag at Gettysburg.

Late 19th century
J.A. Long, W.W. Kitchin, A.R. Foushee, J.S. Bradsher, J.C. Pass, W.F. Reade, and R.E. Long were key leaders who helped make a transition to a more diversified economic base after the Civil War. The arrival of the newly constructed Norfolk and Western Railroad was a major influence around 1890, as it enabled the addition of tobacco processing plants and warehouses to the rural economy. Although the processing plants disappeared many years ago, a few of the warehouses still stand.

J.A. Long established Peoples Bank in 1891 and the Roxboro Cotton Mill in 1899, later known as Tultex Yarns. His home at Roxboro, the James A. and Laura Thompson Long House, was added to the National Register of Historic Places in 2005. Long died in 1915 but was succeeded by his son, J.A. Long, Jr., who began attracting new business to Roxboro. Baker Company opened here in 1923, making textile manufacturing a major contributor to the local economy for decades. Baker was merged with Collins and Aikman Corporation (C&A), becoming a major industry in Person County for several decades before closing in August 2006. Textile manufacturers have moved to other locations in the US and overseas.

20th and 21st centuries
Residential and commercial development have grown steadily over the past few years in part due to the county's location near the Research Triangle region. The Hyco Lake area and southern portion of the county have had an influx of new home and commercial development in the late 20th and early 21st century. The county's largest employers are Duke Energy, Eaton Corporation, Georgia-Pacific Corporation and GKN Driveline.

The Holloway-Walker Dollarhite House, Henry-Vernon House, Burleigh, and Waverly Plantation are listed on the National Register of Historic Places outside Roxboro.

Geography

Person County contains parts of three major river basins:  the Neuse, the Roanoke and the Tar, providing essential clean drinking water to the south and east of the state. The origin of the Tar River is in southeast Person County.  In the northwest section of the county is Hyco Lake, with Mayo Reservoir in the northeast section.  Both lakes are used for electrical power generation and recreation.  Near the western border with Caswell County is Lake Roxboro. Part of the Neuse River begins here with the Flat River, where it combines with the Little and Eno rivers to go into Falls Lake and create the Neuse.

The Uwharrie Mountains, part of North Carolina's easternmost mountain range, are the oldest mountain range in North America.  They are the lowest mountain range in the state.  The Uwharries begin in Montgomery County and terminate at Hager's Mountain in the hills of northern Person County.

The county is largely covered by rolling hills divided by farmlands and forest.  The area's ridges are not narrow and sharp like those in some parts of the Piedmont, and the gullies and ditches are not as abrupt.  The northern part of the county between the lakes is skirted by a plateau.  The highest point of the county is a prominent hill in Roxboro, where the county seat has located its water reservoir tank.  Person County claims three small mountains. Hager's Mountain is north of Roxboro. Red Mountain and Mt. Tirzah are in the southeastern part of the county.  The geology of the county is dominated by igneous formation, overlaid by a variety of soils. Granite boulders are strewn across the county.

State and local protected areas 
 Hagers Mountain
 Mayo Lake Park

Major water bodies 

 After Bay Reservoir
 Byrds Creek
 Castle Creek (Hyco River tributary)
 Flat River
 Ghent Creek
 Hyco Lake
 Mayo Lake
 Mill Creek
 Richland Creek (South Hyco Creek tributary)
 Roxboro Lake
 South Hyco Creek
 Storys Creek (Hyco River tributary)
 Tar River

Adjacent counties
 Halifax County, Virginia - north
 Granville County - east
 Durham County - south
 Orange County - south
 Caswell County - west

Major highways
 
 
 
 
 

Interstate 85 is the closest interstate highway to the county, located 29 miles south in Durham.

Major infrastructure 
 Norfolk Southern, freight rail service

Demographics

2020 census

As of the 2020 United States census, there were 39,097 people, 15,896 households, and 10,695 families residing in the county.

2010 census
As of the census of 2010, there were 39,464 people, 15,826 households, and 10,979 families residing in the county.  The population density was 91 people per square mile (35/km2).  There were 15,504 housing units at an average density of 40 per square mile (15/km2).  The racial makeup of the county was 68.1% White, 28.3% Black, 0.61% Native American, 0.15% Asian, 0.01% Pacific Islander, 1.37% from other races, and 0.86% from two or more races. Hispanic or Latino people of any race were 2.09% of the population.

There were 14,085 households, out of which 31.5% had children under the age of 18 living with them, 53.8% were married couples living together, 13.8% had a female householder with no husband present, and 28.2% were non-families. 24.2% of all households were made up of individuals, and 10.1% had someone living alone who was 65 years of age or older.  The average household size was 2.50 and the average family size was 2.95.

In the county, the population was spread out, with 24.0% under the age of 18, 7.4% from 18 to 24, 30.6% from 25 to 44, 24.2% from 45 to 64, and 13.3% who were 65 years of age or older.  The median age was 38 years. For every 100 females there were 93.2 males.  For every 100 females age 18 and over, there were 90.2 males.

The median income for a household in the county was $42,559 and the median income for a family was $54,474. Males had a median income of $30,970 versus $22,804 for females. The per capita income for the county was $22,189.  About 9.4% of families and 12.0% of the population were below the poverty line, including 14.9% of those under age 18 and 17.3% of those age 65 or over.

Law, government, and politics
Person County is a member of the Kerr-Tar Regional Council of Governments.  The county government is administered by an elected county commission, and county law enforcement is administered by an elected sheriff and his officers. The county is politically conservative and Republican. No Democratic presidential candidate has carried Person County since Jimmy Carter in 1980. Before being won by George Wallace in 1968, Person County had been part of the Democratic "Solid South", voting Democrat in most elections between 1880 and 1964, except the elections in 1892 and 1908, with six consecutive Democratic presidential nominees receiving seventy-five percent of the county's vote between 1932 and 1952.

Elected officials (As of 2021)
 Ted Budd (R), U.S. House of Representatives
 Mike Woodard (D), State Senator
 Larry Yarborough (R), State Representative
 Dewey Jones (D), Sheriff
 Kyle Puryear (R), County Commissioner
 David Newell (R), Chairman- County Commissioner
 Ray Jeffers (D), County Commissioner
 Jimmy Clayton (D), County Commissioner
 Gordon Powell, Vice Chair, County Commissioner
 Jimmy Wilkins, School Board Vice-Chairman
 Jennifer Kafer, School Board Member
 Freda Tillman, School Board Member
 Margaret Bradsher, School Board Member

Economy
The economy of Person County is dominated by electrical, textile, administrative, manufacturing, aerodynamics, viticulture, brokering, food processing, automotive, aluminum and paper products. Diversification from traditional flue cured tobacco to include burley tobacco and other modes of agriculture is underway.

Person County is home to two industrial parks: Person County Business and Industrial Center (PCBIC), located on Durham Road (US 501), and North Park, located north of Roxboro on North Park Drive.

Person County is also near North Carolina's Research Triangle, home to numerous high-tech companies and enterprises.

Person County offers a strategic location for business and industry, as it is within an hour's drive of North Carolina's two major economic centers, the Research Triangle (Durham, Chapel Hill and Raleigh) and the Piedmont Triad (Greensboro, Winston-Salem and High Point), and within a two-hour drive of Richmond, Virginia.

Healthcare
 Person Memorial Hospital
 Hospital of the Duke University Health System
 Roxboro MedAccess
Person County Medical and Dental

Education

Higher education 
 Piedmont Community College offers associate degrees, technical training programs, and college credit which is transferable to local state supported colleges/universities. There is a satellite campus in neighboring Caswell County.

Public education

Person County School System
Public education is provided by the Person County School System and administers a single unified school district with a K-12 program. As of fiscal 2018-2019, the school system consists of:

 4,364 students
 555+ staff

Charter schools
The State of North Carolina also provides for a certain number of charter schools.  These are administered separately from the Person County School System. Roxboro has two charter schools:
 Bethel Hill Charter School, an alternative  public school that offers young kids an alternative for grades K-6, opened for the 2000–2001 school year. Total enrollment is 385.
 Roxboro Community School, an alternative to the state public school system, is located in uptown Roxboro. It is housed in the historic Roxboro Cotton Mill/Tultex building, which is on the National Register of Historic Places. The school opened for the 2006–2007 school year. Currently serves grades 6-12. Total enrollment is 700.

Private education
 Person Christian School
 Roxboro Christian Academy was founded in 1976 and serves a K-12 program. Total enrollment is 176.
 Zion Christian Academy was founded in 2002 and offers a 1-12 program. Total enrollment is 30.

Communities

City
 Roxboro (county seat and largest city)

Census-designated place
 Rougemont

Townships

 Allensville
 Bushy Fork
 Cunningham
 Flat River
 Holloway
 Mount Tirzah
 Olive Hill
 Roxboro
 Woodsdale

Unincorporated communities

 Ai
 Allensville
 Bethel Hill
 Brooksdale
 Bushy Fork
 Cavel
 Ceffo
 Concord
 Cunningham
 Denny Store
 Five Forks
 Gentry Store
 Gordonton
 Hesters Store
 Hurdle Mills
 Leasburg
 Longhurst
 Longs Store
 Moriah
 Mount Tirzah
 Olive Hill
 Paynes Tavern
 Peeds Store
 Roseville
 Semora
 Somerset
 Surl
 Timberlake
 Triple Springs
 Whitt Town
 Woodsdale

Notable people
 Henry Atkinson, soldier
 Leonidas Berry, medical doctor, inventor of Eder-Berry biopsy gastroscope
 Robert L. Blackwell, one of two soldiers from North Carolina to receive the Medal of Honor for service during World War I; killed in action October 11, 1918
 Margie Bowes, country music singer
 Mic'hael Brooks, defensive tackle for the Seattle Seahawks
 Carl Long, NASCAR driver
 Wendy Palmer, former WNBA player
 Ray Scott, country music singer
 Enos Slaughter, aka "Country", St. Louis Cardinals, and Baseball Hall of Fame inductee
 Jim Thorpe, Champions Tour golfer
 Luke Torian, politician, Virginia House of Delegates 52nd District

See also
 List of counties in North Carolina
 National Register of Historic Places listings in Person County, North Carolina
 Sappony, state-recognized tribe that resides in the county

References

External links

 
 
 Roxboro Area Chamber of Commerce

 
Research Triangle
1791 establishments in North Carolina
Populated places established in 1791